Herbert Packer may refer to:

 Herbert Annesley Packer (1894–1962), British Royal Navy admiral
 Herbert L. Packer (1925–1972), American criminologist